Michael P. Doyle is a professor of chemistry at University of Texas at San Antonio. Doyle was awarded the George C. Pimentel Award in Chemical Education by the American Chemical Society in 2002. and elected as a Fellow of the American Association for the Advancement of Science in 1995.

References

External links 
 Homepage (University of Texas at San Antonio)

Year of birth missing (living people)
American chemists
University of Texas at San Antonio faculty
Living people